Morarji Desai became the Chief Minister of Bombay State on 21 April 1952, following the Indian National Congress' victory in 1952 Bombay Legislative Assembly election. He formed a nine-member ministry that continued till his resignation on 31 October 1956. Yashwantrao Chavan succeeded him as the head of government.

Government formation
B. G. Kher, Bombay's chief minister since 1946, did not seek another term and retired following the 1952 election. Desai had been Kher's home and revenue minister since 1946, and had previously served as agriculture, revenue, and rural development minister from 1937 to 1939. He was selected to replace Kher.

In October 1956, the Desai government faced a motion of no confidence tabled by Naushir Bharucha. The same was defeated in the assembly by 33 to 234 votes.

List of ministers

Deputy ministers

References

Indian National Congress
D
D
Cabinets established in 1952
Cabinets disestablished in 1956
Bombay State